The FIL World Luge Championships 2012 was held on February 10–12, 2012, under the auspices of the International Luge Federation at the bobsleigh, luge, and skeleton track in Altenberg, Germany for the second time after having hosted the World championships in 1996. The facility was chosen at the 56th FIL Congress in Calgary, Alberta, Canada on June 28, 2008

Medalists

Medal table

Men's singles

Women's singles

Men's doubles

Team relay

Finalists

Both tracks submitted their proposals prior to the end of the bidding deadline. Altenberg was chosen following Whistler withdrawing their bid.

References

FIL World Luge Championships
2012 in German sport
Sport in Altenberg, Saxony
2012 in luge
International luge competitions hosted by Germany
2010s in Saxony